Rune Westberg is a Danish born songwriter, record producer, mixer and multi instrumentalist living and working in Los Angeles.

He has written and produced for artists including Adam Lambert, Colbie Caillat, Daughtry, Prince Royce, Jesse & Joy, Rachel Platten, Nina Nesbitt, Alvaro Soler, Haley Reinhart, Axelle Red, Better Than Ezra, Reece Mastin, Bonnie Anderson, Casey Abrams, Kris Allen, Jessica Sanchez, The Saturdays, David Cook, Tegan Marie, Axelle Red, Kristinia DeBarge, Hedley, Natalie Grant, Brooke White, The JaneDear Girls, MoZella, Tiffany Page, Our Lady Peace, Beth Hart, Hiroko, Tyler Hilton, Jason Reeves, Alphabeat, Saybia, Carpark North, Tue West, Magtens Korridorer, Poul Krebs and Mani Spinx.

Westberg's songs have been featured in many TV series including Californication, Shameless, Suits, Vampire Diaries, The Hills, Keeping Up With The Kardashians, Queen Sugar, Valor, American Woman, Grey's Anatomy, All American, The Rookie, Riverdale, Girlfriends' Guide To Divorce, Switched At Birth, Pretty Little Liars, 90210 as well as in major global advertising campaigns for Adobe and Citroen. 

He released a solo album in 2001, entitled "Rune Westberg".

In 2010 Westberg won a BMI award for "No Surprise", a single on Daughtry's second album Leave This Town 

In 2016, he was nominated for a Latin Grammy for Song of the Year with "Ecos De Amor" performed by Jesse & Joy.

List of released songs written by or written and produced by Rune Westberg

References

Danish songwriters
Danish record producers
Living people
Year of birth missing (living people)